Ahmed Talbi (born 28 August 1981 in Berkane) is a Moroccan footballer. He is currently attached to Renaissance de Berkane.

References

Living people
1981 births
Association football midfielders
Moroccan footballers
Wydad AC players
Moghreb Tétouan players
People from Berkane
RS Berkane players